Trisetum canescens is a species of grass known by the common names tall trisetum and tall false oat.

Distribution
The bunchgrass is native to western North America from Alaska and British Columbia to central California and Arizona, where it occurs in forests, mountain meadows, and streambanks, being most common among Ponderosa pines and stands of spruce and fir.

Description

There are three to four leaves per stem, the blades reaching up to 30 centimeters in length. The sheaths can be hairless to quite hairy, the hairs sometimes long and shaggy.

The inflorescence is an open or compact panicle of green, tan, or purplish spikelets up to 20 centimeters long.

References

External links
Jepson Manual Treatment: Trisetum canescens
Grass Manual Treatment — Trisetum canescens
Trisetum canescens — U.C. Photo gallery

canescens
Bunchgrasses of North America
Grasses of the United States
Grasses of Canada
Native grasses of California
Flora of Alaska
Flora of British Columbia
Flora of the Northwestern United States
Flora of Arizona
Flora of the Sierra Nevada (United States)
Natural history of the California Coast Ranges
Flora without expected TNC conservation status